Gail Chanfreau (née Sherriff; born 3 April 1945), also known as Gail Lovera and Gail Benedetti, is a French former amateur and professional tennis player.

Tennis career
Chanfreau was born in Australia, but moved to France in 1968. Chanfreau made her first appearance in the Federation Cup for Australia in 1966. She played for France Fed Cup team from 1969 to 1980.

When Gail beat her sister Carol Sherriff, who reached the third round of the Australian Open on five occasions, 8–10, 6–3, 6–3 in the 1966 Wimbledon Championships second round, that was the second match between sisters at Wimbledon, the first being in the 1884 Wimbledon Championships when Maud Watson beat Lillian. The next Wimbledon match between sisters was in 2000 between Serena and Venus Williams.

Chanfreau reached the quarterfinals of the Australian Open in 1967 and 1972, and the quarterfinals of the French Open in 1968 and 1971. She won the French Open doubles in 1967, 1970 and 1971 with Françoise Dürr and 1976 with Fiorella Bonicelli.

At the Cincinnati Masters, she reached the singles final in 1969, only to fall to future International Tennis Hall of Fame inductee Lesley Turner Bowrey, 1–6, 7–5, 10–10 ret.

She was international veterans mixed-doubles champion in 1968 and 1975 with Pierre Darmon.

Personal life
She married French tennis player Jean-Baptiste Chanfreau in 1968 and moved to France. Her second marriage was to another French tennis player, Jean Lovera.

Grand Slam tournament finals

Doubles: 7 (4 titles, 3 runner-ups)

References

External links
 
 
 

1945 births
Australian female tennis players
Australian emigrants to France
French Championships (tennis) champions
French female tennis players
French Open champions
French people of Australian descent
Living people
Grand Slam (tennis) champions in women's doubles
Tennis players from Sydney